Hespererato is a genus of small sea snails, marine gastropod mollusks in the family Eratoidae, the false cowries or trivias.

Species
Species within the genus Hespererato include:
 † Hespererato ampulla (Deshayes, 1835) 
 † Hespererato emmonsi (Whitfield, 1894) 
 † Hespererato marqueti Fehse & Landau, 2002 
 Hespererato nanhaiensis Ma, 1994
 Hespererato rubra Fehse, 2016
 Hespererato scabriuscula (Sowerby, 1832)
 Hespererato vitellina (Hinds, 1844)
Species brought into synonymy
 Hespererato columbella (Menke, 1847): synonym of Archierato columbella (Menke, 1847)
 Hespererato galapagensis Schilder, 1933: synonym of Archierato galapagensis (Schilder, 1933)
 Hespererato marginata (Mörch, 1860): synonym of Archierato columbella (Menke, 1847)
 Hespererato martinicensis Schilder, 1933: synonym of Archierato martinicensis (Schilder, 1933)
 Hespererato maugeriae (Gray, 1832): synonym of Archierato maugeriae (Gray in G. B. Sowerby I, 1832)
 Hespererato pallida Oleinik, Petuch & Aley IV, 2012: synonym of Eratoidea watsoni (Dall, 1881)
 Hespererato rehderi (Raines, 2002): synonym of Sulcerato rehderi (Raines, 2002)
 Hespererato septentrionalis Cate, 1977: synonym of Eratoena septentrionalis (Cate, 1977)
 † Hespererato zevitellina Laws, 1941: synonym of † Bellerato zevitellina (Laws, 1941)

References

Eratoidae
Gastropod genera